Campbells Run is a  long 2nd order tributary to Chartiers Creek in Allegheny County, Pennsylvania.

Variant names
According to the Geographic Names Information System, it has also been known historically as:
Campbell's Creek

Course
Campbells Run rises about 0.25 miles east of Montour Church and then flows southeast to join Chartiers Creek at Carnegie.

Watershed
Campbells Run drains  of area, receives about 37.8 in/year of precipitation, has a wetness index of 337.81, and is about 36% forested.

See also
 List of rivers of Pennsylvania

References

Rivers of Pennsylvania
Rivers of Allegheny County, Pennsylvania